Dasa is a town, or eup in Dalseong County, Daegu, South Korea. The township Dasa-myeon was upgraded to the town Dasa-eup in 1997. Dasa Town Office are located in Maegok-ri. Jukgok-ri which include Jukgok Residential Area is crowded with people.

Communities
Dasa-eup is divided into 11 villages (ri).

References

External links
Official website 

Dalseong County
Towns and townships in Daegu
Enclaves and exclaves